Colm O'Rourke (born 31 August 1957) is a Gaelic football manager, former player, retired secondary school principal, sports broadcaster and columnist. He has been manager of the Meath county team since 2022.

O'Rourke's league and championship career at senior level with the Meath county team spanned twenty years from 1975 to 1995.

Born in Aughavas, County Leitrim, his family moved to Skryne in County Meath, where O'Rourke spent his youth. He played competitive Gaelic football during his schooling at St Patrick's Classical School in Navan. O'Rourke first appeared for the Skryne club at underage levels, before winning two county senior championship medals in 1992 and 1993. He gained his Bachelor of Arts degree (1978) and Higher Diploma in Education (1979) from University College Dublin. While studying at University College Dublin he won a Sigerson Cup medal in 1979. He was awarded UCD Alumnus of the Year in Sport in 2016.

O'Rourke made his debut on the inter-county scene when he was picked for the Meath minor team. He later joined the under-21 side but enjoyed little success in these grades. O'Rourke made his senior debut during the 1975-76 league. Over the course of the next twenty years he was a regular member of the starting fifteen and won back-to-back All-Ireland medals in 1987 and 1988. He also won five Leinster medals, three National Football League medals and was named Footballer of the Year in 1991. O'Rourke played his last game for Meath in July 1995.

In retirement from playing O'Rourke combined his teaching career with a new position as a sports broadcaster. His media career began with RTÉ where he has worked as a studio analyst with the flagship programme The Sunday Game for over twenty-five years. O'Rourke also writes a weekly column for the Sunday Independent.

Early and family life
Despite becoming a Meath county footballer, O'Rourke is not a Meathman by birth; he was born in the small parish of Aughavas within County Leitrim. He moved with his family as a youngster from County Leitrim to County Meath

O'Rourke's son Shane also played with the Meath senior football team, while his nephew Paddy played as a goalkeeper for Meath.

Playing career
As a Gaelic footballer, O'Rourke won two All-Ireland medals with Meath, in 1987 and 1988. He also won five Leinster Senior Football Championship medals and three National Football League titles. His involvement would be considered pivitol for Meaths success against Dublin at this time.

O'Rourke received three All-Star for Meath in 1983, 1988 and 1991. His performance, playing with a bandaged knee, in the Dublin-Meath matches of the summer of 1991 are still recounted in Meath. When playing for Meath he was part of a full forward line of himself, Brian Stafford and Bernard Flynn, often considered to be one of the best full-forward lines of all time.

In May 2020, O'Rourke was included in the Irish Independent'''s "Top 20 footballers in Ireland over the past 50 years", where he was regarded as inferior to such players as Donegal's Michael Murphy and Tyrone's Seán Cavanagh.

Management career
O'Rourke has managed Simonstown Gaels GFC in Navan, guiding them to two Meath Senior Football Finals in 2003 and 2004, only for the team to lose on both occasions. He also guided the club to its first adult title in 2005 when it won the Meath Football League Division 1.

He led Simonstown Gaels to their very first Senior Championship in 2016 and then again in 2017.

He returned as Simonstown manager for a fourth stint in November 2020, hinting that this would be his last managerial job.

O'Rourke managed Ireland's team that competed in the Compromise Rules competition on two outings, 1998 and 1999.

O'Rourke is currently the manager for the senior men's team in St Patrick's Classical School, they compete in the A division and in 2001, 2003 and 2004 they won the Hogan cup in the All-Ireland, reaching the final most recently in 2013.

He ruled himself out of contention to replace Andy McEntee as county team manager in 2022, stating: "My beautiful wife Patricia has a very negative view toward managing the county team and with good reason when you see the upshot of Andy McEntee going and the social media abuse that has taken place. People who put in enormous time at their own expense - it's not like Pep Guardiola getting £15m a year - and then being subjected to that sort of thing by unnamed people. I can't understand how, in a society, we can allow people to abuse others without having given their name and address. It's just a shocking indictment of society in general".

In July 2022, O'Rourke was confirmed as the new manager of the Meath senior football team.

Teaching
For 42 years O'Rourke worked at St Patrick's Classical School in Navan, first as a teacher, then later as principal. He also trained the school's Gaelic football team, managing them to numerous successes at provincial and national levels. In October 2022, O'Rourke announced that he would be retiring as principal to focus on his role as manager of the Meath senior inter-county mens team.

Despite his classical education, he has been known to mix up his Latin with his Greek in public.

During the COVID-19 pandemic in the Republic of Ireland, he voiced his disagreement with the then education minister Joe McHugh's plan to delay the Leaving Cert until July as well as his plans to socially distance it. He voiced his concerns on how this would be feasible and on the safety of teachers overseeing the exam.

Media career
O'Rourke started working for RTÉ on The Sunday Game in 1991, and has been a contributed sports columns in the Sunday Independent.

He writes occasional columns for the Sunday Independent on the topic of education.

O'Rourke also is slated to make a cameo role in "The Rising" an Irish film that covers the events of the Easter Rising.

In 2020, O'Rourke was accused of using homophobic language on television.

Political beliefs
O'Rourke is an opponent of the welfare state. He is an anti-communist. He has written about his disapproval of Sinn Féin.

O'Rourke wrote in defence of Phil Hogan after the Oireachtas Golf Society scandal forced the European Commissioner from office, describing Hogan as one of the "good people" and the "constant rage" at his wanderings around three provinces to play golf among other things as "a bit over the top".

Career statistics

References

External links

 Official Meath website
 Colm O'Rourke at the Sunday Independent''

1957 births
Living people
Alumni of University College Dublin
Gaelic football forwards
Gaelic football managers
Gaelic games commentators
Gaelic games writers and broadcasters
Heads of schools in Ireland
Ireland international rules football team coaches
Irish businesspeople
Irish columnists
Irish sportswriters
Leinster inter-provincial Gaelic footballers
Meath inter-county Gaelic footballers
Sportspeople from County Leitrim
Sunday Independent (Ireland) people
Skryne Gaelic footballers
Texaco Footballers of the Year
20th-century Irish people
21st-century Irish people
UCD Gaelic footballers
Winners of two All-Ireland medals (Gaelic football)